Terre Haute North Vigo High School, also known as Terre Haute North (THN), is a public high school located in Terre Haute, Indiana.

Academics 
Advanced Placement classes include Calculus AB, Physics (Mechanics), Physics (Electricity and Magnetism), U.S. History, World History, U.S. Government, Biology, Chemistry, English, Spanish, and more.

Athletics 
There are 21 varsity teams at THN: boys' and girls' cross country, soccer, tennis, golf, basketball, swimming & diving and track & field; boys' football, wrestling, baseball; girls' volleyball, softball, and dance team. Terre Haute North was a part of the Metropolitan Interscholastic Conference (MIC) from 1997 until 2013 when they joined Conference Indiana.

Notable alumni
 Brian Dorsett (1979) is a retired professional baseball player who played eight seasons for the Cleveland Indians, Los Angeles Angels of Anaheim, New York Yankees, San Diego Padres, Cincinnati Reds and Chicago Cubs.
 Josh Phegley (2006) is an MLB catcher, currently playing for the Chicago Cubs. Phegley formerly played for the Chicago White Sox and the Oakland Athletics.
 Anthony Thompson (1986) is a former Indiana University football standout (1986–1989) and NFL running back (1990–92).  He was inducted into the College Football Hall of Fame in 2007.
 Steve Weatherford (2001) is a National Football League punter. He played for the New Orleans Saints, Kansas City Chiefs, Jacksonville Jaguars, New York Jets and New York Giants from 2006 to 2015, becoming a Super Bowl XLVI champion with the Giants.
 Clyde Lovellette (Terre Haute Garfield (1948) before consolidation) former professional basketball player; 3x NBA Champion, 3x All-American, NCAA MOP (1952), 1952 Olympic Gold Medalist.
 Terry Dischinger (Terre Haute Garfield (1959) before consolidation) former professional basketball player; 3x All-American, NBA Rookie of the Year, 1960 Olympic Gold Medalist.
 Frank Hamblen (Terre Haute Garfield (1965) before consolidation) was a professional basketball coach and 7-time NBA champion, Phil Jackson's assistant with Chicago Bulls and Los Angeles Lakers and interim head coach. He is a member of the Indiana Basketball Hall of Fame.
 Ron Greene (Terre Haute Gerstmeyer (1957) before consolidation) is a former college basketball head coach.
 Tommy John (Terre Haute Gerstmeyer (1961) before consolidation) is a former Major League Baseball pitcher. He played for seven different teams from 1963 through 1989 and had 288 MLB victories. He is also known for his recovery and comeback from a revolutionary ulnar collateral ligament surgery, that has since become universally known as Tommy John surgery.
 Steve Newton (Terre Haute Gerstmeyer (1959) before consolidation) is a former college basketball head coach.

See also
 List of high schools in Indiana
 Terre Haute South Vigo High School

References

External links
 Terre Haute North Homepage

Public high schools in Indiana
Former Southern Indiana Athletic Conference members
Educational institutions established in 1971
Education in Terre Haute, Indiana
Schools in Vigo County, Indiana
Buildings and structures in Terre Haute, Indiana
1971 establishments in Indiana